Paul Nicholas Mason (born 1958) is an English-born Canadian novelist, playwright, and actor.

Early years
Mason was born in London, England. He lived as a child in Rhodesia (now Zimbabwe) and British Columbia before settling in southern Ontario, where he finished high school. After graduating from Trent University in Peterborough with an honors degree in English Literature, and a B.Ed. from Queen's University at Kingston, he taught English and Drama for 32 years at Lakefield College School. He published his first novel in 2005 and retired from teaching in 2015.

Career as a novelist
Mason's first novel, Battered Soles, was published by Turnstone Press in 2005. The novel celebrates a fictional pilgrimage from Peterborough, Ontario, to the small village of Lakefield, where there is, Mason asserts, a statue of a blue-skinned Jesus with healing powers in the basement of St. John's Anglican Church. The tone of the novel is comic but there are moments of pathos. It was nominated for the Stephen Leacock Medal for Humour in 2005.

Mason's second novel, The Red Dress, was published by Turnstone in 2008. The story of a 17-year-old young man growing up poor and confused in rural Ontario, it is darker than Battered Soles, but the ending is cautiously hopeful.  The Red Dress is set in a village called Greenfield, but the landmarks and features of the community suggest that Mason has blended Lakefield, Ontario with Barriefield, just outside the city of Kingston. The Red Dress was long-listed for the 2009 ReLit award.

Mason's third novel, The Night Drummer, was published by Vancouver's Now or Never Press in 2015. It is the story of two teenage friends—white middle-class Peter Ellis, and Otis James, a native boy adopted by an evangelical Christian couple old enough to be his grandparents. Peter and Otis grow up in small town Ontario in the 1970s, and the novel follows them through their high school years. "As Ellis sleeplessly anticipates his high school's looming 25-year reunion, his recollections balance moments of encroaching darkness with plenty of joyous light," says Publishers Weekly. "Ellis’s memories of first loves and jobs and an endearingly oddball assortment of friends, including Otis, a preternaturally wise and kind Ojibwe boy adopted by devout Caucasian parents, give this portrait a welcome sweetness that draws attention to the innocence, sheer possibility, and blithe lightheartedness of youth." A review in the Autumn 2017 issue of The Link reads, "The 1970s were a vibrant time of progressive change, and with its evocation of growing up in that wonderful era The Night Drummer makes for fascinating and entertaining reading."

A fourth novel, The Rogue Wave, was published in April 2021 by Now or Never of Vancouver. Canadian librarians voted it one of three "Most Anticipated Canadian books published" that month. Goodreads gave it a 3.54 Rating.

Mason's Facebook page reveals that a fifth novel, To Our Graves, is scheduled for publication in the spring of 2024. It appears to be a murder mystery set in a Canadian private school.

Mason has published two plays, The Discipline Committee and Circles of Grace (1995), which have been produced in Canada, Ireland and the United States. Their publisher is Dramatic Publishing of Woodstock, Illinois. His play Sister Camille's Kaleidoscopic Cabaret won the Christians in Theatre Arts Full Length Play award in 1996, and premiered in Michigan in 1998. 

Now or Never published Mason's first children's book, A Pug Called Poppy, in the fall of 2017.

Career as an actor
Mason began a new career in 2015 as a voice-, television- and film-actor. He has roles in numerous feature films. He also has a small principal role in the CBS television series Blood & Treasure and appears in single episodes of series such as Anne with an E. He has also done voice-overs for, among other campaigns, the Mirvish production of Harry Potter & the Cursed Child.

Bibliography
The Discipline Committee Woodstock, Illinois: Dramatic Publishing, 1995.
Circles of Grace Woodstock, Illinois: Dramatic Publishing, 1995.
Battered Soles Winnipeg: Turnstone Press, 2005.
The Red Dress Winnipeg: Turnstone Press, 2008.
The Night Drummer Vancouver: Now or Never Publishing, 2015.
Jim's Star & Other Christmas Stories Peterborough: House Nash Press, 2015
A Pug Called Poppy  Vancouver: Now or Never Publishing, 2017.
Maisie's Bench Peterborough: House Nash Press, 2021
The Rogue Wave Vancouver: Now or Never Publishing, 2021

References

External links
  Clip from Speak Your Mind
  Clip from A Dog in Paris
  Clip from The Customer
  Clip from The Mechanical Boy
  
 Article on Mason in Peterborough This Week, duplicated on mykawartha website
 OpenBookToronto interview with author
  Article on Mason in Peterborough This Week
  Article about ''The Rogue Wave in the star.com

20th-century Canadian dramatists and playwrights
21st-century Canadian novelists
Canadian schoolteachers
Canadian male novelists
Canadian children's writers
Teachers of English
Drama teachers
Living people
1958 births
Canadian male dramatists and playwrights
20th-century Canadian male writers
21st-century Canadian male writers
People from London
Trent University alumni
Queen's University at Kingston alumni